Yazīd ibn Hishām ibn ʿAbd al-Malik, commonly known as al-Afqam, was an Umayyad prince who played military and political roles during the reign of his father, Caliph Hisham ibn Abd al-Malik, and during the reigns of his own cousins, caliphs al-Walid II and Yazid III.

Life
Yazid was the son of the Umayyad caliph Hisham ibn Abd al-Malik and his favored wife Umm Hakim, the daughter of Yahya ibn al-Hakam, brother of Hisham's grandfather Caliph Marwan I. He was nicknamed "al-Afqam". 

He may have led the Hajj pilgrimage to Mecca in 738, though other accounts hold it was his brother Sulayman, and led it again in 741. He was imprisoned by Caliph al-Walid II soon after his accession in late 743. Al-Walid was assassinated in 744 and Yazid was the first to give the oath of allegiance to the usurping caliph Yazid III.

References

Bibliography

8th-century Arabs
Sons of Umayyad caliphs
Year of birth unknown
Prisoners and detainees of the Umayyad Caliphate
People of the Third Fitna